Brandval is a former municipality in the old Hedmark county, Norway. The  municipality existed from 1867 until its dissolution in 1964 when it became part of Kongsvinger Municipality. It was located in the southern part of the traditional district of Solør. The administrative centre of the old municipality was the village of Brandval where Brandval Church is located. The municipality included the populated Glomma river valley in the west and the more sparsely populated Finnskogen forest area in the east.

Name
The municipality (originally the parish) is named after the old  farm, since the first Brandval Church was built there. Thus the name likely refers to a forested area that was cleared by burning.

History
Historically, Brandval was part of the large parish of Grue. On 1 January 1838, when municipalities were established in Norway, Brandval was part of Grue Municipality, making up the southern part of the municipality. On 1 January 1867, the Brandval area (population: 3,946) was separated from Grue to become the new Brandval municipality. This left Grue with 6,464 residents. In 1941 a small part of Grue municipality (population: 68) was transferred to Brandval municipality. During the 1960s, there were many municipal mergers across Norway due to the work of the Schei Committee. On 1 January 1964, the municipality of Brandval (population: 4,384) was merged with the town of Kongsvinger (population: 2,349) and the municipality of Vinger (population: 6,257) to form the new Kongsvinger Municipality which had a total population of 12,990 residents.

Government
The municipality was governed by a municipal council of elected representatives, which in turn elected a mayor.

Municipal council
The municipal council  of Brandval was made up of representatives that were elected to four year terms.  The party breakdown of the final municipal council was as follows:

Mayors
The mayors of Brandval:

1868-1870: Lars Bredesen Breen
1871-1886: Per Hansen Gjølstad
1887-1889: Kolbjørn Olsen
1890-1897: Per Hansen Gjølstad
1898-1901: Martin Hansen
1902-1910: Arne Næss
1911-1913: Rangvald Jahr
1914-1919: Nils Aas
1920-1931: Ole Ruud
1932-1934: Kasper Dalermoen
1935-1936: Arnt Nylund
1937-1937: Thor Hals
1938-1940: Gustav Storhæsen
1941-1945: Ole Sandbæk
1945-1947: Anton Braaten
1948-1963: John Ruud

See also

List of former municipalities of Norway

References

Kongsvinger
Grue, Norway
Former municipalities of Norway
1867 establishments in Norway
1964 disestablishments in Norway